Pako 2 is a car chase simulator and endless driving game developed and published by Tree Men Games. Pako 2 was released on November 16, 2017 for macOS and Microsoft Windows and later released on Android and iOS on January 31, 2018. is a sequel of Pako - Car Chase Simulator released in 2014. The vehicle is only controllable by steering left or right without the gas pedal or brakes only on the original release of the game.

Gameplay
In Pako 2, the player drives in a selected level to flee from cops trying to stop them. The longer the player survives, the tougher the cops will be. The player can also perform a drive-by shooting at police cars while delivering robbers to their designated location. Once the player's car bumps into any obstacle, they will die.

In-game credits or real money (through in-app purchases) can be used to buy a variety of different vehicles and power-ups for one's garage.

Reception

Pako 2 has received a score of 80 out of 100 on Metacritic,

References

External links

2017 video games
Android (operating system) games
Driving simulators
IOS games
MacOS games
Single-player video games
Windows games